St Petersburg Classical Gymnasium is a coeducational public school (# 610) established in 1989 in Saint Petersburg, Russia.  It is one of the innovative independent schools created in St Petersburg after the collapse of the Soviet Union (See Literature).  Formally gymnasium consists of two institutions: secondary school (from 5th to 9th grades) and high school (10th and 11th grades).  Up until 2011 there were two classes (around 50 students) enrolled every year, but since then three classes (around 75 students) are formed in the 5th grade. The mission of the school is to teach students how to learn, to develop independent analytical thinking and strengthen their interest in acquiring new knowledge. The school lays an emphasis on ancient languages and maths.

Governance 
The general governance is exercised by the elected body of government – Gymnasium Council. It consists of 17 members. A principal of the school, his deputies as well as directors of the boards of subjects participate ex officio, others are elected by direct and secret ballot. The council shall meet at least once in two months.

Admission 
The school is highly selective. The admission process is merit-based and consists of special entrance examination (in Russian), which is designed by the school faculty. 
The education is free for students.

Curriculum 
The curriculum is based on the model of late 19th – early 20th century Russian classical gymnasia with the following core subjects: Latin and Ancient Greek, English and German, Mathematics. At the moment it is the only school in Russia where Ancient Greek is a compulsory core subject and one of the few schools where Latin is a part of the curriculum. Apart from the core subjects and all required Russian state standard subjects (Russian and World History, Literature, Russian, Biology, Chemistry, Geography, Physics, Informatics, Fine Arts and Music, Social Studies) curriculum includes Advanced Ancient History and Ancient Literature. The school is highly acclaimed for the rigor and systematic character of its educational model. Unfortunately, an incorporation of both Latin and Ancient Greek into the official Russian school curriculum does not leave any substantial space for the electives (there is only one elective in the high school).

Exams 
As in all other Russian schools, the students take annual exams every June. However, the number of exams in the gymnasium is unusually large and is growing from one in the 5th grade to five in the 9th grade (and later).

Secondary School Annual Exams:

5th grade:	Latin + Math Test
6th grade:	Latin, History  + Math Test
7th grade:	Latin, Geometry, English/German + Algebra Test, Biology Test
8th grade:	Ancient Greek, Russian, Physics, History + Algebra Test, Geography Test
9th grade:	Math (ГИА), Russian (ГИА), Geometry, Latin, Ancient Greek

High School Annual Exams:

10th grade:	Literature, English, German, Ancient Greek, Physics, Mathematical Analysis + Chemistry Test
11th grade:	Math (ЕГЭ), Russian (ЕГЭ), Latin, Ancient Greek

Extracurricular activities and clubs 

There are quite many extracurricular activities and clubs of different character and not only related to Antiquity, Ancient History or Ancient Languages in the school. There is a very successful Theater program with the annual 'Great Dionysia' festival. The gymnasium collaborates with the Hermitage Museum in the development of Art programs. There are 18 International exchange programs with gymnasia and colleges from few European countries (Germany, Netherlands, Italy, Great Britain).

Bibliotheca Classica 

Gymnasium houses a classics reference library, Bibliotheca Classica, which was founded in 1993 as a new independent research center. There are many libraries in St. Petersburg, but the Bibliotheca Classica is the first one to have books on classics on open shelves for quick reference and easy access. Here students can find the most important Greek and Latin texts, dictionaries, and other works of reference as well as books covering numerous aspects of classical research. Since its foundation the library has acquired through gifts and purchased approximately 30 000 volumes.

Graduates 

Currently (2020) there are 928 graduates of the Gymnasium. 53 of them are PhD degree holders from leading Russian and international Universities in different academic fields:  24 - in Philology and Linguistics, 10 - in History, Philosophy, Political Science, Law, Pedagogy, 10 - in Medicine, Chemistry, Biology, Bioengineering, Psychology, Geology, 5 - in Mathematics and Physics, 4 - in Economics. Here is the full list in Russian.

12 graduates currently teach and more than 40 have been teaching at the Gymnasium. Again, here is the list of graduates/teachers in Russian.

Literature 

Buryachko, Sergey. Saint Petersburg Classical High School (1989 - 2009) // // Humanitas Europae Foundation Website.

Zelchenko, Vsevolod. GYMNASIUM CLASSICUM PETROPOLITANUM (in French) // Humanitas Europae Foundation Website.

Smirnov, Sergei. An Experiment in Revival of the Classical Gymnasium. Lessons and Prospects // Russian Education and Society. Vol. 36, Issue 2, 1994. P. 54 – 68.

Westbrook, Marie A.; Lurie, Lev; Ivanov, Mikhail. The Independent Schools of St. Petersburg. Diversification of Schooling in Postcommunist Russia // Education and Society in the New Russia. Ed. by Anthony Jones. M.E. Sharpe Publishing House, 1994. P. 110 – 112.

Hohn, Kerstin. Homer und Cicero statt Marx und Lenin. Experiment und Wandel an den russischen Schulen und Hochschulen (in German). «Frankfurter Allgemeine Zeitung», 25. Januar 1992.

Barring, Felicity. SOVIET TURMOIL; Joyfully, Improbably, a School Opens in Leningrad. New York Times, September 2, 1991.

External links 
Official website: 610.ru/en/

Bibliotheca Classica website: http://www.bibliotheca-classica.org/en/node/107

Humanitas Europae Foundation Website

Schools in Saint Petersburg
Educational institutions established in 1989
1989 establishments in the Soviet Union